Elections to Stockport Metropolitan Borough Council were held on 1 May 2008.  One third of the council was up for election. The Liberal Democrats held overall control of the council.

The council is currently made up of;

Summary

The following summary indicates the number of seats which are being defended by each party.

Ward results

Bramhall North ward

Bramhall South ward

Bredbury and Woodley ward

Bredbury Green and Romiley ward

Brinnington and Central ward
A month after the election Councillor Chris Walker was charged with racist abuse of a police officer and suspended by the Liberal Democrats and served as an Independent councillor, he was found guilty in April 2010. Walker returned to the Lib Dems in November 2010. He declared himself Independent again in June 2011. He did not try to defend the seat at the May 2012 election.

Cheadle and Gatley ward

Cheadle Hulme North ward

Cheadle Hulme South ward

Davenport and Cale Green ward

Edgeley and Cheadle Heath ward

Hazel Grove ward

Heald Green ward

Heatons North ward

Heatons South ward

Manor ward

Marple North ward

Marple South ward

Offerton ward

Reddish North ward

Reddish South ward

Stepping Hill ward

References

2008
2008 English local elections
2000s in Greater Manchester